Rifampicin/isoniazid/pyrazinamide, also known as rifampin/isoniazid/pyrazinamide, and sold under the trade name Rifater, is a medication used to treat tuberculosis. It is a fixed dose combination of rifampicin, isoniazid, and pyrazinamide. It is used either by itself or along with other antituberculosis medication. It is taken by mouth.

Side effects are those of the underlying medications. These may include poor coordination, loss of appetite, nausea, joint pain, feeling tired, and numbness. Severe side effects include liver problems. Use in those under the age of 15 may not be appropriate. It is unclear if use in pregnancy is safe for the baby.

Rifampicin/isoniazid/pyrazinamide was approved for medical use in the United States in 1994. It is on the World Health Organization's List of Essential Medicines.

Medical uses
The hope of a fixed-dose combination pill is to increase the likelihood that people will take all of three medications.  Also, if people forget to take one or two of their drugs, they might not then develop resistance to the remaining drugs.

Society and culture
It is manufactured by Aventis.

See also
 Tuberculosis treatment
 Rifampicin + isoniazid + ethambutol

References

Anti-tuberculosis drugs
Combination drugs
Rifamycin antibiotics
Wikipedia medicine articles ready to translate
Sanofi
World Health Organization essential medicines